Aleksandar Madžar may refer to:
Aleksandar Madžar (soccer) (born 1978), Montenegrin footballer
Aleksandar Madžar (musician) (born 1968), Serbian pianist